Arbelodes heringi is a moth in the family Cossidae. It is found in Namibia, where it has been recorded from Windhoek. The habitat consists of montane wooded grasslands.

The length of the forewings is about 10 mm. The forewings are glossy ecru olive, but smoke grey with deep greyish-olive spots along the costa. The terminal band is pure white, edged with sepia towards the base. The hindwings are glossy ecru olive.

References

Natural History Museum Lepidoptera generic names catalog

Endemic fauna of Namibia
Moths described in 1930
Metarbelinae